The Liberal Reformist Party (PLR) was a Spanish political party launched by Francisco Romero Robledo in 1886 from elements of the Liberal Conservative Party. It rejoined the PLC in 1891. Romero reconstituted the party in 1898, lasting until his death in 1906.

Bibliography

References

Defunct political parties in Spain
Defunct liberal political parties
Political parties established in 1886
Political parties disestablished in 1891
1886 establishments in Spain
1891 disestablishments in Spain